DotNetBrowser is a proprietary .NET library that provides a Chromium-based engine which can be used to load and display web pages.
 It is developed and supported by TeamDev since 2015.

Features
Some main features are as follows:
 Load and display the web page.
 Embed a Chromium-based browser in a .NET desktop application as a  WPF or Windows Forms control.
 Handle navigation and network events. 
 Access Document Object Model of the loaded web page.
 Execute JavaScript on the loaded web page, inject .NET objects and call them from JavaScript

Usage
Primary usage is embedding a browser into various .NET desktop applications and displaying the web pages. DotNetBrowser can be used as a headless browser. The headless mode is also available on Linux and macOS.

Another known use-cases are creating web-based kiosk applications and VSTO add-ins for Microsoft Office.

More examples and use-cases are available in the DotNetBrowser Examples repository.

Example

WPF
XAML markup
<Window x:Class="Sample.Wpf.MainWindow"
        xmlns="http://schemas.microsoft.com/winfx/2006/xaml/presentation"
        xmlns:x="http://schemas.microsoft.com/winfx/2006/xaml"
        xmlns:d="http://schemas.microsoft.com/expression/blend/2008"
        xmlns:mc="http://schemas.openxmlformats.org/markup-compatibility/2006"
        xmlns:wpf="clr-namespace:DotNetBrowser.Wpf;assembly=DotNetBrowser.Wpf"
        mc:Ignorable="d"
        Title="MainWindow" Height="450" Width="800" Closed="MainWindow_OnClosed">
    <Grid>
        <wpf:BrowserView x:Name="browserView"/>
    </Grid>
</Window>
C#
using System;
using System.Windows
using DotNetBrowser.Browser;
using DotNetBrowser.Engine;

namespace Sample.Wpf;

public partial class MainWindow : Window
{
    private readonly IEngine engine;
    private readonly IBrowser browser;
     
    public MainWindow()
    {
        InitializeComponent();
         
        // Create and initialize the IEngine
        engine = EngineFactory.Create();
         
        // Create the IBrowser
        browser = engine.CreateBrowser();
        browser.Navigation.LoadUrl("https://teamdev.com/dotnetbrowser");
         
        // Initialize the WPF BrowserView control
        browserView.InitializeFrom(browser);
    }
     
    private void MainWindow_OnClosed(object sender, EventArgs e)
    {
        browser.Dispose();
        engine.Dispose();
    }
}

Windows Forms
C#
using System;
using System.Windows.Forms;
using DotNetBrowser.Browser;
using DotNetBrowser.Engine;
using DotNetBrowser.WinForms;

namespace Sample.WinForms;

public partial class Form1 : Form
{
    private readonly IEngine engine;
    private readonly IBrowser browser;
     
    public Form1()
    {
        InitializeComponent();
         
        // Create and initialize the IEngine
        engine = EngineFactory.Create();
         
        // Create the Windows Forms BrowserView control
        BrowserView browserView = new BrowserView() {
            Dock = DockStyle.Fill
        };
         
        // Create the IBrowser
        browser = engine.CreateBrowser();
        browser.Navigation.LoadUrl("https://teamdev.com/dotnetbrowser");
         
        // Initialize the Windows Forms BrowserView control
        browserView.InitializeFrom(browser);
         
        // Add the BrowserView control to the Form
        Controls.Add(browserView);
        Closed += Form1Closed;
    }
     
    private void Form1Closed(object sender, EventArgs e)
    {
        browser.Dispose();
        engine.Dispose();
    }
}

See also
 Chromium Embedded Framework
 Electron

References

External links
 
  - the DotNetBrowser support website containing documentation and release notes.
  - the repository containing various examples of using DotNetBrowser.

.NET software
Chromium
Proprietary software
Windows-only software